is a professional Japanese baseball player. He plays pitcher for the Fukushima Hopes.

His younger brother Naoya is also a professional baseball player currently playing for Chiba Lotte Marines.

External links

 NPB.com

1987 births
Living people
Baseball people from Hiroshima Prefecture
Japanese baseball players
Nippon Professional Baseball pitchers
Tokyo Yakult Swallows players